Amir Carlos  Damaso Vahidi Agassi (born December 12, 1979, in Makati, Philippines), popularly known as Carlos Agassi and simply Amir, is a Filipino actor, rap artist, host, and model. He was launched as a member of ABS-CBN's Star Circle (now Star Magic) Batch 3 in 1993.

Career
Agassi is a member of ABS-CBN's circle of homegrown talents named Star Magic. He was part of a male group dubbed as "The Hunks" together with Piolo Pascual, Jericho Rosales, Diether Ocampo, and Bernard Palanca. During his tenure as part of The Hunks, he has been a primetime actor when he co-starred with Claudine Barretto in the hit teleserye Sa Dulo ng Walang Hanggan which ran from 2001 to 2003.

Aside from acting, he had hosting stints in the variety show ASAP and also hosted a hidden camera practical joke television series entitled Victim, patterned on America's Punk'd.

After an almost two-year hiatus from acting, Agassi returned on television via ABS-CBN's Agua Bendita in 2010 where he played as one of the primary antagonists.

In 2014, Agassi appeared in GMA Network's Elemento.

Controversies
Agassi has been a victim of numerous death hoax claiming that he had died due to alleged anabolic steroid abuse and that prior to his rumored death, Agassi had undergone dialysis procedure with the reason being on a kidney failure. The rumors had been proven false by Agassi himself. Agassi stated in an interview that his buff physique is a product of physical workout since the age of 16.

Given the moniker "The Amir of (Philippine) Rap", Agassi was met with criticism by the likes of veteran rappers Loonie, D-Coy of Madd Poets and Krazykyle of Rapskallion. He even filed a case against D-Coy and Krazykyle in 2006 and demanded the pulling of copies of the album United Freestyle v.2 where the lyrics of songs "Right Now" (D-Coy) and "No Album Got Skills" (Krazykyle) contain the lines "Ang dapat sa'yo mag-disappear tulad ng showbiz na si Amir" and "I destroy emcees more than your eyes can see, don't battle me I'll make you look like Carlos Agassi" respectively. The case, however, was quietly settled. In response to criticism, he together with Gloc-9 and Mitchell Silonga released a single entitled "Alay Ko" in 2009, a song about Agassi's thoughts on destructive criticisms.

Other ventures
Agassi went on hiatus from showbiz sometime in the mid 2000s to finish his degree in Psychology at De La Salle University. He also ventured into the restaurant business and opened Brasas, a Latin-American inspired restaurant in Metro Manila. Agassi also has his own recording studio called "Amir Carlos Agassi, Inc." where he releases his rap music and collaborates with other artists.

Personal life
Agassi's younger brother Michael is an actor and was married to actress Cherry Lou. His other brother Aaron is both an actor and singer.

Agassi was previously engaged to model and Pinoy Big Brother housemate Margo Midwinter. The couple called off the engagement in 2013. Agassi was also in a relationship with actress Gwen Garci. Currently, Agassi is dating non-showbiz Sarina Yamamoto.

Filmography

Television

Film

Discography

Studio albums

References

External links
 

1979 births
Living people
Filipino male child actors
Filipino male television actors
Filipino rappers
21st-century Filipino male singers
Filipino male models
Filipino people of Iranian descent
People from Makati
Pop rappers
Male actors from Metro Manila
21st-century Filipino male actors
De La Salle University alumni
Filipino restaurateurs
Businesspeople from Metro Manila
Filipino male film actors